Frederick William Lambton, 4th Earl of Durham (19 June 1855 – 31 January 1929) was a British peer, a Liberal (and later Liberal Unionist) politician, and the son of George Lambton, 2nd Earl of Durham. He inherited the Earldom from his twin brother, John Lambton, 3rd Earl of Durham, when the latter died with no legitimate children.

He married Beatrix Bulteel (1859 – 27 April 1937), his second cousin once removed, on 26 May 1879). They had six children:

Lady Violet Lambton (3 July 1880 – 22 February 1976), married John Egerton, 4th Earl of Ellesmere and had issue.
Lady Lilian Lambton (8 December 1881 – 26 September 1966), married Charles Douglas-Home, 13th Earl of Home and had issue.
John Frederick Lambton, 5th Earl of Durham (7 October 1884 – 4 February 1970)
Hon. Geoffrey Lambton (13 September 1887 – 1 September 1914), married Dorothy Leyland and had issue.
Hon. Claud Lambton (3 December 1888 – 7 September 1976), married Olive Eleanor Lockwood and had issue.
Lady Joan Katherine Lambton (21 September 1893 – 4 January 1967), married Hugh Joicey, 3rd Baron Joicey and had issue.

He was elected at the 1880 general election as a Liberal Member of Parliament (MP) for South Durham, 384 and held that seat until the constituency was abolished for the 1885 general election. He did not stand in 1885, but having joined the Liberal unionists in 1885 he unsuccessfully contested Berwick-Upon-Tweed in 1886, Sunderland in 1892, and a by-election in South East Durham in February 1898.

He was returned to the House of Commons after a fifteen-years absence at the 1900 general election, when he defeated Joseph Richardson, the Liberal winner of the 1898 by-election. Lambton was re-elected unopposed in 1906, but lost the seat by a wide margin to a Liberal candidate in January 1910.

References

External links 
 
 

Durham, Frederick Lambton, 4th Earl of
Durham, Frederick Lambton, 4th Earl of
Durham, Frederick Lambton, 4th Earl of
Frederick Lambton, 4th Earl of Durham
Liberal Party (UK) MPs for English constituencies
UK MPs 1880–1885
Liberal Unionist Party MPs for English constituencies
UK MPs 1900–1906
UK MPs 1906–1910
Durham, E4
Liberal Unionist Party peers